The Winnett School is a site on the National Register of Historic Places located in Winnett, Montana.  It was added to the Register on April 6, 1995. The property is no longer in use and may have been replaced by a new building on the same lot.

It was built in two phases in 1919 and 1921.  It was designed by architect Otto Wasmansdorff of Lewistown, Montana and built by Sullivan Construction of Roundup, Montana.

References

School buildings on the National Register of Historic Places in Montana
National Register of Historic Places in Petroleum County, Montana
1919 establishments in Montana
School buildings completed in 1919
American Craftsman architecture in Montana